Peter Mortimer (born January 28, 1974) is an Emmy-winning American filmmaker from Colorado. He is best known for being the creator of the Reel Rock Film Tour, as well as the director of feature documentaries The Alpinist, The Dawn Wall and Valley Uprising. He has produced and directed multiple films related to rock climbing, mountaineering, and outdoor adventure under the production group Sender Films.

Early life

Mortimer was born in Philadelphia, Pennsylvania. He attended Colorado College graduating with honors in geology. He later attended the University of Southern California School of Cinema and Television, receiving his MFA in film.

Career

His productions have won numerous film festival awards, two sports Emmys, a news and documentary Emmy, a critics choice award, and been nominated for a PGA Award.   Peter is also co-founder, along with Josh Lowell of Big UP Productions, of Reel Rock, coming up on in its 17th year and showing in over 450 locations across the world. His newest feature film The Alpinist (featuring Marc-André LeClerc) won the prestigious award "Outstanding Long Documentary" at the 2022 Sports Emmys ceremony.

Filmography
 Front Range Freaks (2003)
 Return2Sender (2005)
 First Ascent (2006)
 King Lines (2007)
 The Sharp End (2008)
 First Ascent: The Series (2010)
 Reel Rock Film Tour (2010)
 Reel Rock 6 (2011)
 Reel Rock 7 (2012)
 Reel Rock 8 (2013)
 Valley Uprising (2014)
 Reel Rock 10 (2015)
 Reel Rock TV Series (2015-)
 Reel Rock 11 (2016)
 Reel Rock 12 (2017)
 The Dawn Wall (2018)
 Reel Rock 13 (2018)
 Reel Rock 14 (2019)
 Reel Rock 15 (2020)
 The Alpinist (2021)
 Reel Rock 16 (2022)
 Reel Rock 17 (Coming Spring 2023)

Awards and honors

Awards:

The Alpinist (2021)

Sports Emmy Award: Long Sports Documentary 

Sports Emmy Nomination: Outstanding Camera Work 
Critics Choice Award: Best Sports Documentary
Critics Choice Nomination: Best Cinematography

The Dawn Wall (2018) 

SXSW: Audience Award (Documentary Spotlight) 

Greenwich International Film Festival: Best Documentary Feature 

Valley Uprising (2014)

 News and Documentary Emmy: Outstanding Graphic Design & Art Direction

First Ascent (2011)
 Sports Emmy: Outstanding Camera Work[17]

King Lines (2007)

Sports Emmy: Outstanding Camera Work

References

External links
 Sender Films
 Reel Rock 
 Big Up Productions

Living people
USC School of Cinematic Arts alumni
1974 births
Film producers from Pennsylvania
Artists from Philadelphia